Elachista filiphila is a moth of the family Elachistidae. It is found along the southern coast of Western Australia.

The forewings are bluish grey. The hindwings are grey.

The larvae feed on an unidentified Cyperaceae species. They mine the culms of their host plant. The mine starts as a narrow gallery which is directed straight upward. Later it turns downward, first under the epidermis, broadening until the whole stem is hollow. Pupation takes place outside of the mine.

References

External links

Moths described in 2011
Endemic fauna of Australia
filiphila
Moths of Australia
Taxa named by Lauri Kaila